Eric G. Griego (born January 22, 1966) is an American politician from the state of New Mexico. A member of the Democratic Party, he served in the New Mexico Senate, representing the 14th district, from 2009 to 2013. He began his political career elected as a councilman to the Albuquerque City Council, serving 1999 to 2004.

Griego sought the Democratic nomination in the 2012 Congressional election, losing to Michelle Lujan Grisham in the three-candidate primary.

Early life and education
Griego was born in 1966 and raised in a Catholic family in Albuquerque, New Mexico. After attending local schools, Griego completed a Bachelor of Arts degree in Journalism and Government at New Mexico State University in 1989 and an Master of Public Administration in Public Management at University of Maryland in 1991.

Career
Griego worked as an international economist for the Department of Labor, and as a specialist in Latin American labor issues. He also served as Assistant Cabinet Secretary, New Mexico Economic Development Department, 2005–2007. He has served as executive director, New Mexico Voices for Children, 2009–2012.

He became more active in politics, and in 1999 he was elected as a Democrat to the Albuquergue City Council, serving until 2004. In 2008 he was elected to the New Mexico State Senate, serving until early 2013.

In 2012 Griego ran in the Democratic primary for the nomination to the US House of Representatives seat from New Mexico's 1st congressional district. It was a three-way race, won by Michelle Lujan Grisham. She also won the general election. She has since been elected as governor of the state. In 2016, Griego became the New Mexico director of the Working Families Party.

Personal life 
Greigo and his wife, Kim, have 2 children

On January 20, 2013, his brother Greg, sister-in-law Sarah, and three of their ten children were found shot to death in their home in the south valley of Albuquerque, New Mexico. Greg and Sarah's son Nehemiah, 15 years old at the time, was charged with the crimes. In October 2015, Nehemiah Griego pleaded guilty to two counts of second-degree murder and three counts of child abuse resulting in death. Although he was originally sentenced as a juvenile, this ruling was overturned on appeal in August 2019. Nehemiah Griego, now 22, will be sentenced as an adult. Griego was ultimately sentenced to three concurrent life sentences plus seven years to run consecutively with the life sentences with credit given for the 2,476 days – six years and 285 days already served and in all must serve 30 years before being eligible for parole. Nehemiah Griego is currently imprisoned in the Lea County Correctional Center.

References

External links
 Senator Eric G. Griego – (D) at New Mexico Legislature
 Eric G. Griego - Political Summary at Project Vote Smart
 Eric Griego: 9 Questions with the New Mexico Senator behind the ‘Stand with the 99%’ Petition. Dan O'Mahony, "Point Nine Nine", November 14, 2011

1966 births
Hispanic and Latino American state legislators in New Mexico
Living people
Democratic Party New Mexico state senators
Politicians from Albuquerque, New Mexico